Amanita sinicoflava, the mandarin yellow ringless amanita, is an edible species of fungus in the large genus Amanita. Found in North America, the fungus was described as new to science in 1998 by mycologist Rodham Tulloss. The type collections were made in Sussex County, New Jersey. The mushroom grows in  sandy soil under Quercus, Pinus rigida, Acer rubrum, Quercus alba, and Quercus velutina. Fruitbodies have yellow-olivaceous or olive-tan caps that measure  in diameter. There are grooves on the cap margin that extend about 40% of the distance from the margin to the apex. The white stipe is ornamented with slightly darker fibrils, and there are sac-like remnants of the volva at the stipe base. The specific epithet sinicoflava means "Chinese-yellow", referring to the cap color.

See also

List of Amanita species

References

External links

sinicoflava
Fungi of the United States
Fungi described in 1988
Fungi of North America
Fungi without expected TNC conservation status